Aql Hashem (1952 – January 30, 2000), also spelled Akel Hashem, was a Colonel in the South Lebanon Army (SLA) and served under Colonel Saad Haddad and later Lieutenant General Antoine Lahad. He was killed in a remote-controlled bomb attack by Hizbollah in his farm in January 2000. His death was widely interpreted as the beginning of the end of the Israel-backed SLA.

Biography
Aql Hashem was a Maronite Christian born in 1952 at the small village of Debel in Southern Lebanon, close to the Israeli border. Hashem early decided on a military career and by the time the Lebanese Civil War broke out in 1975, he had reached the rank of Sergeant in the Lebanese Army.

When the Lebanese Armed Forces structure collapsed in January 1976, he joined then Major Saad Haddad's Army of Free Lebanon (AFL) faction in Marjayoun (later known as the Free Lebanese Army or FLA), which was widely seen as an Israeli proxy force. After Haddad's death in 1984, the FLA militia was reorganized as the SLA under the command of retired Lieutenant General Antoine Lahad. Two years later Hashem was promoted to Colonel and assumed command of the western sector of the security zone. Col. Hashem was also head of the SLA's Security Service, since he spoke fluent Hebrew and had excellent relations with the Israelis.

Hashem was sentenced to death in absentia for treason by a Lebanese military court. He was widely considered a traitor in Lebanon because of his collaboration with Israel. This was especially true among the Muslim Shia majority population of Southern Lebanon. The resistance to the Israeli occupation, where the SLA was considered partners, increased in the 1990s. The Islamic Resistance movement Hizbollah often referred to the SLA as Israel's "sandbags".

Aql Hashem was responsible for the day-to-day operations of the SLA and was set to replaced Lahad as commander, who was going to retire. He had avoided many previous assassination attempts by Hezbollah fighters and was generally considered as "untouchable".
As Hizbollah stepped up its attacks on the Israel Defense Forces (IDF) and the SLA positions in Southern Lebanon throughout the 1990s, morale plummeted in the SLA and many of its members defected, giving up information to the resistance.

Death
On 30 January 2000 Hizbollah finally succeeded in assassinating Col. Hashem by a remote-controlled bomb in his farm outside Debel. The planning and execution of the operation was filmed and broadcast by Hizbollah's own TV-station al-Manar. Two Hizbollah fighters, identified as "Jawad, 25 " and "Hadi, 28" were interviewed and told in detail about the operation.
One of the participants of the assassination was Khalid Bazzi, who would later serve as the Hizbollah commander of Bint Jbeil during the 2006 Lebanon War. IDF Brigadier General Efraim Sneh blamed Syria for the assassination.

The South Lebanon Army collapsed in April 2000, less than six months after Col. Hashem's death. Hundreds of former SLA officers and soldiers fled to Israel with their families. Those SLA members who chose to remain in Lebanon were arrested by either Hezbollah guerrillas, Amal fighters or the Internal Security Forces (ISF) and the Lebanese Army, being sentenced to varying prison terms for their crimes. Hashem's family fled to Israel, but his wife and two of his children later returned to Lebanon in 2013.

See also
Army of Free Lebanon
South Lebanon Army
Lebanese Civil War
1978 South Lebanon conflict
1982 Lebanon War
South Lebanon conflict (1985–2000)

References

Bibliography 
Nicholas Blanford, Rob Shapiro, et al, Warriors of God, Inside Hezbollah's Thirty-Year Struggle Against Israel, Random House, New York 2011. 
Zahera Harb, Channels of Resistance in Lebanon, Liberation, Propaganda, Hezbollah and the Media, I.B. Tauris, London 2011. 

1952 births
2000 deaths
People of the Lebanese Civil War
People murdered in Lebanon
Assassinations in Lebanon